Les Mystères du Château de Dé (The Mysteries of the Chateau of Dice) is a 1929 film directed by Man Ray. It depicts a pair of travellers setting off from Paris and travelling to the Villa Noailles in Hyères. At 27 minutes the film was the longest that Man Ray directed during his career.

Synopsis
To the Viscountess of Noailles. I dedicate these pictures which can never reveal the extent of her kindness and charm. How two travellers arrived in St. Bernard, what they saw in the ruins of an old castle on top of which a modern-time castle stands. The travellers: MAN RAY, J.-A. Boiffard.

The film opens from a night scene to two masked individuals at a cafe. They decide their actions on the role of dice.
A throw of dice will never abolish chance.
(based on a line from Stéphane Mallarmé)

The hands are that of mannequins, their faces devoid of detail. Before the throw, their destination appears on a hillside in the form of both modern and ancient castles.

Are we going?
We're not going
We're going!

And their journey begins. Departing from their cafe, they travel through the French countryside arriving at the town of Hyères and their destination to find the modern castle empty. Elements of the interior explore various spatial relationships and textures. The film shows sculptures by Pablo Picasso and Joan Miró, as well as exploring the unique Cubist garden at Villa Noailles.

After a while, we are introduced to four intruders who are in turn resigning their fate to that of the dice. Upon their throw, they depart for the indoor swimming pool at the villa and entertain the viewer with various diving and gymnastic movements, including a woman juggling underwater and exercising with medicine balls. Actors explore the villas confines, until they eventually retire, fading from the screen.

More moving shots of the villas external until two more travellers arrive at the location, again playing for chance within the garden. They proceed to stay overnight, bringing the film to an abrupt end.

Restoration
Originally a silent film, recent copies have included music taken from Man Ray's personal record collection at the time, including recordings of Erik Satie's Gymnopédies. The musical reconstruction was written by Jacques Guillot.

The film was restored by the Musée National d'Art Moderne under the direction of Jean-Michel Bouhours, a film curator. Restoration of the nitrate prints by Service des Archives du film (CNC) Bois d'Arcy, video editing by Didier Coudray.

Sources
Flicks - March 2001 ; Chris Dashiell (2001)

External links

Version of the film at ubu.com
Villa Noailles

1929 films
Films directed by Man Ray
1920s French-language films
French silent short films
French black-and-white films